Deadwater Valley is a   Local Nature Reserve in Bordon in Hampshire. It is owned by East Hampshire District Council and managed by the Deadwater Valley Trust. Part of the site is a Scheduled Monument.

This site along the west bank of the River Deadwater has a pond, a meadow, wet and dry heath, alder carr and broadleaved and coniferous woodland.  There are Civil War earthworks in the south of the reserve.

References

Local Nature Reserves in Hampshire